Slavery in Poland existed on the territory of the Kingdom of Poland during the rule of the Piast dynasty in the Middle Ages. It continued to exist in various forms until late in the 14th century when it was supplanted by the institution of serfdom, which has often been considered a form of modified slavery.

Terminology
Polish literature refers to this group of people as "unfree people" rather than as slaves (niewolnicy).

History

The institution of slavery as practiced in the Polish territories during the Early Middle Ages played a lesser economic or cultural role than in other states such as Roman Empire where slavery played a crucial role in keeping economy alive. It existed on the territory of Kingdom of Poland during the times of the Piast dynasty; in fact, the number of slaves rose significantly with the establishment of the Polish state, as most of the slaves were owned by the king.

According to Samuel Augustus Mitchell, non-free people were emancipated in Poland in 1347 under the Statutes of Casimir the Great issued in Wiślica, although there are indications that some form of slavery, in practice and law, continued at least till the end of the 14th century.  Throughout the remaining history of feudal Poland, particularly in the Polish–Lithuanian Commonwealth, much of the peasantry was subject to serfdom, which was often likened to slavery. Serfdom was abolished in Poland in the 19th century during the times of the partitions of Poland.

Features
The slaves came primarily from the ranks of prisoners of war, and were treated as a commodity destined mostly for the largest slave market of its age: Prague. Later, between the 11th and 12th century, ransom was popularised due to acceptance of Christianity, but it covered mostly prisoners of prominence. Some people could also become enslaved due to their inability to pay off their debts, and occasionally enslavement was used instead of a death sentence. Children of niewolni would also belong to that class. They belonged to the king or knights. Niewolni owned by the king were organized in units of tens and hundreds. Those who were not owned by the monarch were among the few in the Kingdom of Poland that could not rely on royal justice.

Niewolni had a limited right to relocate themselves, and could own possessions. Over time, their numbers decreased, due in part to some escaping and also because their owners saw it as more profitable to use them as peasants rather than servants. Czeladź would have their own house, and would be little different from regular peasants or serfs.

Present day 

Slavery is illegal in Poland. Poland is part of the European G6 Initiative Against Human Trafficking. Contemporary slavery however still persists in Poland, just as it does in the rest of the world. According the Global Slavery Index, there were 128,000 people living in the condition of modern slavery in Poland as of 2019.

Types of slavery found in Poland include forced labor, forced begging, and forced criminality. Sectors of the Polish economy considered most vulnerable to slavery and other forms of exploitation include agriculture, construction, food processing, housekeeping and cleaning, although problems have also been found in the industrial production and catering sectors. Some of the people subject to forced labour in Poland were from temporary workers from North Korea. Common techniques for trafficking people into slavery from other countries include false job promises, high fees or alleged debts, rape, and withholding the person's documentation. False offers of employment are usually for sales or agricultural work. Many trafficking victims from Bulgaria and Ukraine are forced into sex slavery.

See also 
Jasyr 
Saqaliba 
Slavery in medieval Europe 
Tatar slave raids in East Slavic lands 
Anti-Polish sentiment 
Second serfdom
Serfdom in Poland

Further reading
Tymieniecki K. – Zagadnienie niewoli w Polsce u schyłku wieków średnich (The issue of slavery in Poland in the late middle ages), Poznań 1933
Włodzimierz Szafrański. Problem niewolnictwa w pradziejach ziem polskich (issue of slavery in the prehistory of the Polish lands), „Acta Universitatis Wratislaviensis", „Antiquitas", t. 10 (nr 598), s. 143–154, ii., 1983
W. Korta. Problem niewolnictwa w Polsce wczesnośredniowiecznej (The problem of slavery in early medieval Poland), „Społeczeństwo Polski średniowiecznej. Zbiór studiów”, t. II red. S. R. Kuczyński, Warszawa 1982

References

Economic history of Poland
Legal history of Poland
Poland
History of Poland during the Piast dynasty
Slavery in Europe
Human rights abuses in Poland